Venkata Parvatiswara Kavulu were two prominent Telugu poets; Balantrapu Venkata Rao (1882–1955) and Voleti Parvatisam (1880–1970). Bhava Kusumavali Brundavanam and an unfinished Ramayanam established their reputation as poets honored with the title Kaviraja Hamsalu (swans of the poets).

References

Telugu poets
Indian male poets